Orrell is the name given to a residential area in the Metropolitan Borough of Sefton, Merseyside, England. It is not to be confused with Orrell Park which is a separate neighbouring area.

Governance
For parliamentary elections Orrell is within the Bootle constituency represented by the Labour Party MP Peter Dowd.

The area itself is part of the electoral ward of Netherton and Orrell for elections to Sefton Council, the ward itself is traditionally represented by the Labour Party; the three current representatives on the council are Susan Ellen Bradshaw, Robert John Brennan, and Ian Ralph Maher.

References

External links

Liverpool Street Gallery - Liverpool 20

Towns and villages in the Metropolitan Borough of Sefton